Borrelia valaisiana is a spirochaete bacterium; strain VS116 is the type strain. It is a potential pathogen.

References

Further reading
Diza, Eudoxia, et al. "Borrelia valaisiana in cerebrospinal fluid." Emerging infectious diseases 10.9 (2004): 1692.

Ryffel, Karine, and O. Péter. "From discovery to clinical implications: Borrelia valaisiana." JOURNAL OF SPIROCHETAL AND TICK BORNE DISEASES7.FALL/WIN (2000): 64–72.

External links

Type strain of Borrelia valaisiana at BacDive -  the Bacterial Diversity Metadatabase

valaisiana
Bacteria described in 1997